Scott Pembroke (September 13, 1889 – February 21, 1951) was an American director, actor and screenwriter. He directed more than 70 films between 1920 and 1937. He was born in San Francisco, California and died in Pasadena, California.

Pembroke was married to Gertrude Short.

Partial filmography

 A Country Hero (1917)
 The Girl Who Won Out (1917)
 The Law That Divides (1918)
 Winners of the West (1921)
 The Adventures of Tarzan (1921)
 The Adventures of Robinson Crusoe (1922)
 The Social Buccaneer (1923)
 Kill or Cure (1923)
 Gas and Air (1923)
 Her Dangerous Path (1923)
 Short Orders (1923)
 Rupert of Hee Haw (1924)
 Mandarin Mix-Up (1924)
 Detained (1924)
 Monsieur Don't Care (1924)
 West of Hot Dog (1924)
 Somewhere in Wrong (1925)
 Twins (1925)
 Pie-Eyed (1925)
 The Snow Hawk (1925)
 Navy Blue Days (1925)
 Dr. Pyckle and Mr. Pryde (1925)
 The Terror of Bar X (1927)
 For Ladies Only (1927)
 Ragtime (1927)
 Cactus Trails (1927)
 Polly of the Movies (1927)
 Galloping Thunder (1927)
 Gypsy of the North (1928)
 Sweet Sixteen (1928)
 The Black Pearl (1928)
 The Divine Sinner (1928)
 The Branded Man (1928)
 The Law and the Man (1928)
 Sisters of Eve (1928)
 Should a Girl Marry? (1928)
 Shanghai Rose (1929)
 Two Sisters (1929)
 The Medicine Man (1930)
 The Jazz Cinderella (1930)
 The Lawless Nineties (1936)
 The Oregon Trail (1936)
 Telephone Operator (1937)

References

External links

1889 births
1951 deaths
20th-century American male actors
American male film actors
American male screenwriters
Film directors from California
Male actors from California
Male actors from San Francisco
Screenwriters from California
20th-century American male writers
20th-century American screenwriters